is a former Japanese football player.

Playing career
Fujita was born in Kuroshio, Kochi on January 31, 1982. After graduating from high school, he joined J1 League club Nagoya Grampus Eight in 2000. He played many matches as right and left side back in first season. However he could hardly play in the match from 2001. In 2005, he moved to FC Tokyo. Although he played as right side back in all matches in J.League Cup, he could not play at all in league competition. In 2006, he moved to J2 League club Tokyo Verdy. He played many matches as right and left side back in 2006. However he could not play many matches in 2007. In 2008, he moved to J2 club Tokushima Vortis. he became a regular player as left side back in 2008. However his opportunity to play decreased in 2009. In 2010, he moved to Japan Football League (JFL) club FC Machida Zelvia. He became a regular player and the club was promoted to J2 from 2012. Although the club was relegated to JFL in a year, the club was promoted to the new J3 League in 2014. However he did not play in many matches, and retired at the end of the 2014 season.

Club statistics

References

External links

1982 births
Living people
Association football people from Kōchi Prefecture
Japanese footballers
J1 League players
J2 League players
J3 League players
Japan Football League players
Nagoya Grampus players
FC Tokyo players
Tokyo Verdy players
Tokushima Vortis players
FC Machida Zelvia players
Association football defenders